The 2018 World University Handball Championship was the 24th edition of this Handball event organized by the FISU. It was held in Rijeka, Croatia at the Zamet Hall, from 30 July to 5 August.

Participating teams

Men

Women

Medal summary

Men's tournament
All times are local (UTC+2).

Group stage

Group A

Group B

Ninth place play-off

Lithuania won 82–73 on aggregate.

Fifth to eighth place classification

5–8th place semifinals

Seventh place game

Fifth place game

First to fourth place classification

Semifinals

Third place game

Final

Final standing

Top scorers

Women's tournament

Group stage

Group A

Group B

Classification round

First to fourth place classification

Semifinals

Third place game

Final

Final standing

Top scorers

References

External links
WUC Handball 2018 web site

Handball
University handball championship
World University Handball Championship
World University Handball Championship
World University Handball Championship